Angelo Raso (born 20 July 1981) is an Italian football defender who plays for AC Bellinzona in the Swiss Challenge League.

Career
Raso has spent his entire career with AC Bellinzona, only leaving on loan three times (to FC Chiasso, GC Biaschesi and FC Bodio). He stayed with the club after relegation from the Swiss Super League in 2011.

References

External links
Profile at Football.ch
AC Bellinzona profile 

1981 births
Living people
Italian footballers
AC Bellinzona players
FC Chiasso players
Swiss Super League players
Association football defenders